Davar (lit. Word) was a Hebrew-language daily newspaper published in the British Mandate of Palestine and Israel between 1925 and May 1996.

It was relaunched in 2016, under the name Davar Rishon as an online outlet by the Histadrut.

History
[[File:Davar (דבר) first page, first issue.PNG|thumb|The first page of Davar'''s first issue]]Davar was established by Moshe Beilinson and Berl Katznelson, with Katznelson as its first editor, as the newspaper of the Histadrut. The first edition was published on 1 June 1925 under the name Davar – Iton Poalei Eretz Yisrael (lit. Davar – Newspaper of Eretz Yisrael Workers).

The paper was successful, and published several supplements, including Davar HaPoelet ([Female] Worker's Davar, a women's paper), HaMeshek HaShitufi (Co-operative Economy), Davar HaShvua (Davar This Week) and Davar LeYeldim (Davar for Children), as well as the union newsletter Va'adken (Update). By 1950 it had around 400 employees and had an extensive distribution system.

Upon Katznelson's death in 1944 Zalman Shazar, later President of Israel, took over as editor. Hana Zemer edited the paper between 1970 and 1990.

After the formation of the Labor Party by the merger of Mapai, Ahdut HaAvoda and Rafi in 1968, LaMerhav, the Ahdut HaAvoda-affiliated newspaper merged into Davar. Its last edition published on 31 May 1971 with Davar officially renamed "Davar – Meuhad Im LaMerhav" (lit. Davar – United with LaMerhav).

By the 1980s the paper was in severe financial difficulties. After Zemer retired in 1990, the paper had joint editors Yoram Peri and Daniel Bloch. The paper was renamed Davar Rishon and Ron Ben-Yishai took over as editor. However, the Histadrut closed the newspaper in 1996. Its building on the corner of Melchett and Shenkin streets in Tel Aviv was demolished and replaced by an apartment block.

In 2016, Davar Rishon was relaunched as a web-only news publication. In April, 2019 the website was closed for several weeks in a labor dispute but reopened with a new editorial desk. In October 2019 it started to publish also an English edition. In January 2020 it started to publish an Arabic edition.

Notable journalists

Shmuel Yosef Agnon
Natan Alterman
Yossi Beilin (born 1948)
Moshe Beilinson
Dan Ben-Amotz (1924–89), radio broadcaster, journalist, playwright, and author
Amnon Dankner
Leah Goldberg
 Haim Gouri (born 1923), poet, novelist, journalist, and documentary filmmaker
Uri Zvi Greenberg
Tali Lipkin-Shahak
Aryeh Navon (cartoonist)
Dov Sadan
Yitzhak Yatziv
David Zakai

References

External links

 Searchable archives at Historical Jewish Press
 

1925 establishments in Mandatory Palestine
1996 disestablishments in Israel
Publications established in 1925
Hebrew-language newspapers
Publications disestablished in 1996
Defunct newspapers published in Israel
Histadrut
Mass media in Tel Aviv
Internet properties established in 2016
Daily newspapers published in Israel